Mykhaylo Udod (born 17 February 1997 in Ukraine) is a professional Ukrainian football striker who plays for Dinamo Samarqand.

Career
Udod is a product of the FC RVUFK Kiev Sportive School.

He played for the FC Dynamo-2 Kyiv in the Ukrainian First League and in the FC Dynamo in the Ukrainian Premier League Reserves and Under 19.

References

External links

1997 births
Living people
Ukrainian footballers
Ukrainian expatriate footballers
Association football forwards
FC Dynamo-2 Kyiv players
FC Vorskla Poltava players
FC Kramatorsk players
FC Kremin Kremenchuk players
FC VPK-Ahro Shevchenkivka players
Ukrainian First League players
Expatriate footballers in Kyrgyzstan
Expatriate footballers in Uzbekistan
Ukrainian expatriate sportspeople in Uzbekistan
Competitors at the 2019 Summer Universiade